Carnivores: Cityscape is a 2002 first-person shooter video game developed by Sunstorm Interactive and published by Infogrames for Microsoft Windows. It is the fourth entry in the Carnivores series.

Storyline
The plot expands upon the original storyline told throughout the main Carnivores series, this time pitting humans and dinosaurs in a battle for survival. The story follows the exploits of DinoCorp and their intent on providing its customers with the most unique hunting experience. The company stumbled on a planet filled with dinosaurs remarkably similar to those used to be found on earth, thus allowing the wealthy to travel to the planet to hunt such extraordinary beasts. After a series of unfortunate events the hunters' interest started to diminish and profits quickly plummeted. DinoCorp was forced to rethink their strategy, therefore creating a project with the idea of bringing these amazing creatures to the attention of a broader audience. A large scientific vessel was then commissioned to transport a sizeable array of dinosaur species, the ship's purpose was to visit all earth colonies, exhibiting the creatures to the public creating more revenue in return. Everything ran smoothly until the transport ship, named DinoCorp VII, crashed on the outskirts of a distant earth colony. With the dinosaurs now running rampant, DinoCorp was forced to hire agents in order to eliminate the threat and save the city.

Gameplay
Unlike previous entries in the Carnivores series, Carnivores: Cityscape allows the player to choose between two different game modes; the "Agent" and the "Dinosaur". Agents are equipped with ranged weapons, along with some tactical equipment. Weapons include a standard handgun with infinite ammunition, a shotgun, a sniper rifle, an assault rifle, an "X-Rifle", and a grenade launcher. The Agent features both night-vision and thermal sensing goggles.

The game features only five playable dinosaurs, including Coelophysis and Oviraptor. The game's larger dinosaurs include Nanotyrannus and Suchomimus. Giganotosaurus is the game's strongest dinosaur, but also the slowest. Dinosaurs have no ranged weapons; only their claws and a lunge. Dinosaurs can also activate a "Dino-Vision", which acts much like a combination of both of the Agent's visors; it allows the dinosaur to see in dark areas and highlights foes in thermal readings. Three creatures roam each level, but do not harm the player: Alphadon, Tapejara, and Tylosaurus.

Levels include wilderness, a city, and a subway. As an Agent, the player must complete missions such as travelling to the crashed ship, and rescuing people, including a mayor and subway workers. As a dinosaur, the player must kill all the Agents in each level.

Development and release
Carnivores: Cityscape was developed by Sunstorm Interactive using the Serious Engine, which allowed for the inclusion of multiplayer, as well as large outdoor environments and a high quantity of dinosaurs. The game's producers were Michael Gjere and Peter Eckert of Infogrames, and Troy Buckley and William Vaughan of Sunstorm Interactive. The lead programmer was Pepper Lain Miller, and the lead artist was Todd Marshall. The game's sound and music was created by Gary Phillips. The development team worked with an expert who designed the game's dinosaurs to ensure their realism. The game was published by Infogrames for Microsoft Windows, and was released in the United States on March 27, 2002, after being completed earlier that month.

Reception

According to Metacritic, the game received "Mixed or average reviews."

Ivan Sulic of IGN wrote that without reading the game's instruction manual, "it will seem as if the game just kind of begins out of nowhere. Even the most story devoid titles have some text before they start." Sulic also criticized the game's minimal selection of "bland" weapons, some of which he considered to be "terribly modeled." Sulic also criticized some of the game's graphics as well as the artificial intelligence, and wrote, "Attempting to spruce up the monotony of casual play by incorporating rescue missions (escort the loser) was a terrible, wrong, awful idea."

References

External links
 Carnivores: Cityscape at MobyGames
 Carnivores Cityscape on the Carnivores Fan Guild

2002 video games
Infogrames games
Dinosaurs in video games
First-person shooters
Video games developed in the United States
Video games set in the 22nd century
Windows games
Windows-only games